= Wendy Shacklock =

New Zealand architect

- Born: Wendy Helen Shacklock; Christchurch
- Education: University of Auckland
- Occupation: Architect

Wendy Helen Shacklock is a New Zealand architect.

== Biography ==
Shacklock was born and grew up in Christchurch. After graduating in architectural studies she worked in a company for four years then left to start her own practice. She specialises in residential projects in Auckland. Waiheke and Queenstown.

=== Awards and recognition ===
- 2023 Auckland Architecture Awards: for Tawharanui Pavilion
- 2021 Auckland Architecture Awards: for 2nd on 2nd
- 2019 Auckland Architecture Awards: for Roads End
- 2019 Waikato/Bay of Plenty Architecture Awards: for Checkers, Pauanui
- 2017 Auckland Architecture Awards: for Langs Retreat
- 2015 Auckland Architecture Awards: for Te Kohanga House
